World Series of Fighting 35: Ivanov vs. Jordan was mixed martial arts event promoted by the World Series of Fighting that was held on March 18, 2017 at Turning Stone Casino in Verona, New York.  It was the last for the WSOF before it was rebranded as the Professional Fighters League.

Background
The event was headlined by three different title fights to determine the champions of the Heavyweight, Featherweight, and Bantamweight divisions.

Results

See also
List of WSOF events
List of WSOF champions

References

World Series of Fighting events
2017 in mixed martial arts